An ergonomic keyboard is a computer keyboard designed with ergonomic considerations to minimize muscle strain, fatigue, and other problems.

Features
The common QWERTY keyboard layout is credited to the mechanical typewriter designed by C. Latham Sholes and patented in 1878; research indicates the layout may have been influenced by telegraph operators. The offset in the columns between rows was designed to accommodate the physical links between each key and the internal mechanisms of the typewriter; as typing duties transitioned to electric (motorized) typewriters and then computers, the layout was retained to ease the transition for users that had already been trained to type. However, the legacy mechanical layout has numerous idiosyncrasies, including the staggered column layout, which can force the user into uncomfortable, repetitive movements and postures. Several potential solutions have been proposed since at least 1926.

In general, ergonomic keyboards are designed to minimize awkward user wrist positions and finger motions by rearranging and/or repositioning the keys. For instance, typing on a conventional keyboard layout can force the user into shoulder elevation, wrist ulnar deviation, and head rotation. Consideration of physical ergonomics suggests the most relaxed typing position is one in which the keyboard user's forearms are parallel to the ground, with wrists held straight. To facilitate this posture, Klockenberg published a study in 1926 that suggested the primary key clusters for two-handed typists should be split into left and right halves which are set at an angle to each other, allowing the wrists to remain straight. A more detailed study was published in 1972 by Kroemer, suggesting that an adjustable split keyboard may reduce user pain. During the 1970s, several studies were published suggesting that data entry operators were at risk of developing musculoskeletal injuries.

Split key clusters

Split keyboards group keys into two or more sections. By separating the keyboard, split keyboards typically change the angles and the distance between each section to ensure the user's wrists remain straight. There are three relevant angles: 
 the split, rotation, slant, or opening angle, which refers to the angle between the rows of the left and right halves. Because most shoulders are wider than the hand position when placed on the home row, when using a conventional keyboard, the resulting slight shoulder adduction points the forearms inwards and requires the wrists to be bent out to position the fingers.
 the slope or tilt angle, which refers to the front-to-back angle made between the plane of the keyboard and the supporting surface. This is the angle of rotation around an imaginary horizontal axis drawn through the top of the home row ( /  keys), i.e., from the left edge to the right edge of the keyboard. Conventional keyboards include feet that can be deployed under the top of the keyboard, which generates a positive slope: the topmost rows (– function keys) are higher than the bottom rows, which would require the user to tilt their wrists up. Ergonomic keyboards may use a riser under the front to create a neutral or negative slope instead.
 the lateral inclination, also known as the gable or tenting angle, which refers to the left-to-right angle between the plane of each half with the supporting surface; typically this means the center of the keyboard (inside edge of each half) is elevated compared to the outside edge. A conventional keyboard requires the wrists to be rotated inwards to bring the hands flat.

The distance between the sections usually is selected to reduce or eliminate the shoulder adduction that brings the user's hands toward the center of the keyboard, which on conventional keyboards with no opening angle can also result in an awkward wrist angle. 

Ergonomic split keyboards can be fixed, where the user cannot change the relative angles and distance between the sections, or adjustable, which usually has two independent modules that allow these to be tailored exactly to the user. Fixed split keyboards are necessarily designed to accommodate a wide range of users, and can be set up rapidly to replicate a similar interface in different settings, but may not fit a specific user exactly. For example, people with broad shoulders may benefit from an adjustable split keyboard's ability to customize the distance between the two halves of the keyboard. This ensures the elbows are not too close together when typing. On the other hand, adjustable split keyboards sometimes intimidate potential users, who may fear they may exacerbate or become more susceptible to repetitive strain injuries; fixed split keyboards like the Microsoft Natural have sold well in comparison.

The angled split keyboard (sometimes referred to as a Klockenburg keyboard) is similar to a split keyboard, but the middle is tented up so that the index fingers are higher than the little fingers while typing. Key Ovation makes the Goldtouch ergonomic keyboard which is an adjustable angled split keyboard. On some ergonomic keyboards, the tenting angle is increased to 90° so the user types with their hands perpendicular to the ground, thumbs-up, similar to the hand position adopted by accordion players.

Vertical column layout

Because electric typewriters and computer keyboards no longer need to accommodate a mechanical linkage, the keys can be set in vertical columns without staggering, minimizing lateral finger movements when moving between rows. This vertical layout rearranges the keys into linear columns. If the rows remain aligned horizontally, the resulting ortholinear layout puts the keys on an orthogonal grid. Other designs use vertical columns with staggered rows to compensate for the difference in finger lengths. A keyboard with vertical columns can require an adjustment period as the user retrains their finger movements.

Some keyboards combine a split design with vertical or semi-vertical columns. Examples include the "Truly Ergonomic" (fixed split, staggered rows), ErgoDox (adjustable split, staggered rows), ZSA Moonlander, and Zergotech Freedom (adjustable split, semi-staggered rows) keyboards.

Contoured surface

The preceding split and vertical column keyboards arranged each key cluster onto a single flat plane. Contoured- or dished-surface keyboards like the Maltron (1977) or the newer Kinesis Advantage line (1992+) are fixed split keyboards with tenting that place the keys into two curved depressions set approximately at shoulder width. For these keyboards, the resulting bowl-like key surfaces are intended to minimize and make consistent the finger extension required to strike keys away from the home row. In general, contoured keyboards also incorporate a vertical column layout with staggered rows for each hand. In this configuration, minimal movement of arms and wrists is required.

Some keyboards combine vertical key columns and contoured surfaces with fully-adjustable (independent) split key clusters. Examples include the Kinesis Advantage 360, Dactyl Manuform, and MoErgo Glove80. With a relatively small market, many are custom-built or sold as kits to be assembled by the user, with extensive customization options.

Keyboard alternatives

Handheld keyboards
Handheld ergonomic keyboards are designed to be held like a game controller, and can be used as such, instead of laid out flat on top of a table surface. They allow the user the ability to move around a room or to lean back on a chair while also being able to type in front or away from the computer. Some variations of handheld ergonomic keyboards also include a trackball mouse that allow mouse movement and typing included in one handheld device.

Alternative layouts
A few ergonomic keyboards do not have the typical one key per letter, such as a keyer or a keyless ergonomic keyboard. For example, DataHand eliminates the need for any wrist motion or finger extension; each finger has five separate switches triggered by buttons or paddles.

Advances in speech recognition have made it possible to eliminate the use of a keyboard altogether, particularly on smaller devices that lack traditional keyboard interfaces.

Considerations
It is widely claimed that an ergonomic keyboard may reduce muscle strain and reduce risk of carpal tunnel syndrome or other kinds of repetitive strain injury. With respect to "split" keyboards, quality studies that demonstrate injury reductions are lacking, with the exception of physically split keyboards which have "sharply angled keyboard faces". There is evidence, however, that such keyboards are not well tolerated.

Narrow studies examining hand position at rest neglect many other possible factors. For example, one should be aware that the effect of “ergonomic” keyboards is to change the musculoskeletal region exposed to risk, instead of eliminating hazardous postures.

See also

 List of repetitive strain injury software
 Maltron
 Microsoft ergonomic keyboards
 Repetitive strain injury

References

Further reading
  Although there is not much evidence that ergonomic keyboards can prevent injuries, there is evidence that they may be more comfortable than other keyboards. This article discusses evidence for the latter claim, and suggests which types of keyboards may be best for which users.

Computer keyboard types
Computing input devices
Physical ergonomics